Kingston is a district in the east side of Milton Keynes, in the civil parish of Kents Hill, Monkston and Brinklow.

Kingston District Centre is a large retail development that serves this side of the Milton Keynes urban area (its home parish, Broughton, Middleton and the parish of Walton, Woburn Sands and Wavendon).  The District Centre houses a Tesco hypermarket and other UK high street names, such as Aldi, Boots, Wilko, and other retail outlets. The centre also has a small local library, a meeting place and a separate restaurant building on the Southern ring road.  Its Marks and Spencer closed in February 2020

According to Milton Keynes City Council, Kingston, Wolverton, Bletchley and Westcroft form the second tier in the retail hierarchy of Milton Keynes, below Central Milton Keynes.

Bounded by Chaffron Way (H7) to the north, Tongwell St (A4146/V11) to the east, Standing Way (A421/H8) to the south and Newport Rd (formerly the A5130) to the east, the rest of the district consists of motor dealers, light industry factories and warehouses, including a Costco wholesale.

Transport

Rail

Road

Bus
The district is served by Arriva buses which only connect to other destinations in Milton Keynes: 3/3A, 8/8A/8E and 9/9A.

References

External links
 Shopping in and Around Milton Keynes: KingstonMKweb

Areas of Milton Keynes